Vol. 1 is the debut studio album of Birds of Maya, released on January 21, 2008 by Holy Mountain. The album comprises home recordings made between 2004 and 2006.

Track listing

Personnel
Adapted from the Vol. 1 liner notes.
Birds of Maya
 Jason Killinger – bass guitar
 Ben Leaphart – drums
 Mike Polizze – electric guitar

Release history

References

External links 
 Vol. 1 at Discogs (list of releases)

2008 debut albums
Birds of Maya albums
Instrumental albums